Jardel Filho (24 July 1928 – 19 February 1983) was a Brazilian film actor. He appeared in 45 films between 1949 and 1982.

Filmography

External links

1928 births
1983 deaths
Brazilian male film actors
Brazilian people of Italian descent
20th-century Brazilian male actors